Yuri Vasilyevich Bondarev (15 March 1924 — 29 March 2020) was a Soviet and Russian writer and screenwriter. He was best known for co-authoring the script for the serial film franchise Liberation (1968–71).

Biography
Bondarev took part in World War II as an artillery officer and became a member of the CPSU in 1944. He graduated in 1951 from the Maxim Gorky Literature Institute. His first collection of stories entitled On a Large River was published in 1953.

His first successes in literature, the novels The Battalions Request Fire (1957) and The Last Salvoes (1959) were part of a new trend of war fiction which dispensed with pure heroes and vile villains in favor of emphasizing the true human cost of war. The Last Salvos was adapted for the cinema in 1961. His next novels Silence (1962), The Two (1964) and Relatives (1969) established him as a leading Soviet writer. His novel Silence became a landmark as the first work to depict a citizen who had been wrongly sentenced to the Gulag. His novels generally cover topics of ethics and personal choices.

In the novel The Hot Snow (1969) he again used the theme of war, creating an epic canvas dealing with the Battle of Stalingrad from the viewpoint of its many participants including common soldiers and military commanders. In his novel The Shore (1975), a Soviet writer learns that a German woman, with whom he had a passionate love affair as a young officer, still loves him. He dies before reaching the promised "shore" of his youthful dream. In The Choice (1980) a terminally ill expatriate kills himself on a visit to Moscow so that he can be buried in the city of his youth. His fate causes an old Soviet friend of his to engage in a painful exploration of existential questions.

Bondarev did also much work for the cinema. Besides adapting his own novels for the screen, he co-authored the script for the serial film Liberation.
  
In political life during the early 1990s, Bondarev participated in Russia's national-communist opposition politics, belonging to the National Salvation Front leadership. Bondarev was a member of the central committee of the hardline Communist Party of the RSFSR at the end of the Mikhail Gorbachev era; in July 1991 he signed the anti-Perestroika declaration "A Word to the People".

Bondarev died on 29 March 2020 in Moscow at the age of 96.

Awards

 Hero of Socialist Labour
 Order of Lenin, twice
 Order of the Red Banner of Labour
 Order of the October Revolution
 Order of the Patriotic War, 2nd class
 Order of the Badge of Honour
 Medal For Courage, twice (14 October 1943, 21 June 1944)
 Honorary Citizen of the Hero City of Volgograd
 Alexander Fadeyev Medal for Military Literature
 State Prize of the USSR, 1977, for his novel The Shore
 State Prize of the USSR, 1983, for his novel The Choice
 State Prize of the RSFSR Vasiliev brothers (1975) – a script for the movie "Hot Snow" (1972)
 Alexander Dovzhenko Gold Medal for the screenplay of The Hot Snow (1972)
 Leo Tolstoy Award for Literature
 Mikhail Sholokov Award for Literature
 Medal "For the Defence of Stalingrad"
 Medal "For the Victory over Germany in the Great Patriotic War 1941–1945"
 Lenin Prize (1972) – script for epic Liberation 
 National Award "Stalingrad".
 Medal of the CPRF Central Committee, 90 years of the Great October Socialist Revolution.
 Award CCF (1984) – a script for the film The Coast (1983)

In 1994 he refused to accept the award of Order of Friendship of Peoples from Boris Yeltsin.

English translations
Silence, Houghton Mifflin, 1966.
The Last Shots, Foreign Languages Publishing House, 1970.
The Hot Snow, Progress Publishers, 1976.
The Vigil, from Anthology of Soviet Short Stories, Vol 2, Progress Publishers, 1976.
The Shore, Raduga Publishers, 1984.
The Choice, Raduga Publishers, 1984.
On Craftsmanship, Raduga Publishers, 1984.

Filmography (writer)
The Last Salvos (1961)
 Silence (1963)
  Liberation  (1968–71)

References

1924 births
2020 deaths
20th-century Russian male writers
20th-century Russian short story writers
People from Orsk
Eleventh convocation members of the Soviet of Nationalities
Maxim Gorky Literature Institute alumni
Heroes of Socialist Labour
Lenin Prize winners
Recipients of the Medal "For Courage" (Russia)
Recipients of the Order of Friendship of Peoples
Recipients of the Order of Lenin
Recipients of the Order of the Red Banner of Labour
Recipients of the USSR State Prize
Recipients of the Vasilyev Brothers State Prize of the RSFSR
Russian male novelists
Russian male short story writers
Russian male writers
Russian non-fiction writers
20th-century Russian screenwriters
Male screenwriters
Socialist realism writers
Soviet male writers
Soviet military personnel of World War II
Soviet non-fiction writers
Soviet novelists
Soviet screenwriters
Soviet short story writers
Burials in Troyekurovskoye Cemetery